Bari Assembly constituency may refer to 

 Bari, Odisha Assembly constituency
 Bari, Rajasthan Assembly constituency